Philip Baxter College, University of New South Wales is a residential college at the University of New South Wales in Kensington, Sydney, Australia. Phillip Baxter College and its two neighboring Colleges, Goldstein and Basser, are collectively known as the Kensington Colleges. Philip Baxter college is the largest of The Kensington Colleges. Residents generally stay in Baxter for two or three years before ending their college tenure. A student had to remain at College for two and a half years, to be named Honorary College Valedictorian. Residents are provided with three meals per day during session at the nearby Goldstein Dining Hall, which is shared with residents of the other Kensington Colleges - Basser, Goldstein and Fig Tree Hall.

History
Along with Basser and Goldstein Colleges, Philip Baxter College forms part of the original Kensington Colleges, which have been owned and operated by the University of New South Wales since they were founded in 1959.

The original college was constructed over two years from 1964 to 1966, and opened in 1966. It was the third residential college on the university campus to open.

Named after Sir John Philip Baxter, a former Vice-Chancellor at UNSW and Chairman of the Sydney Opera House Trust, Baxter College took its first residents in 1966.

1985 Conflict with College Master 
In 1985, a conflict arose between college students and "Master" Peter O'Brien, the head of multiple colleges, over allegations of "overuse of authority." This led to the formation of the Students Submission Committee, which aimed to remove O'Brien from his position. The committee was composed of students from Baxter, Basser, and Goldstein colleges and was led by Paul Elton, the president of the 1986 Baxter College House Committee. The committee petitioned the University Council to investigate O'Brien's plans to make Baxter a first-year student only college, the removal of Valedictory dinners, the misuse of house funds, the reinstatement of expelled students, and the fairness of disciplinary actions. On May 12, 1986, the University Council established an ad hoc committee to investigate the matter. O'Brien resigned on July 11, 1986, and was replaced by Dr. Bruce Avis, who discontinued the title of "Master." The events and investigation by the Kensington Colleges Inquiry were reported by the UNSW student newspaper Tharunka, with O'Brien threatening legal action against the publication in 1985 for publishing "allegedly defamatory letters".

Redevelopment 
During 2012 and 2013 Baxter College also housed residents from sister colleges Basser and Goldstein during a major redevelopment of UNSW's student accommodation facility. The $110 million redevelopment that saw The Kensington Colleges completely re-developed and three new colleges added to the portfolio: Fig Tree Hall, Colombo House and UNSW Hall.

The redeveloped Philip Baxter College opened in Semester 1, 2014. It accommodates 201 students in a mixture of rooms with either en suite or shared bathroom facilities. Philip Baxter College has expansive common and study areas as well as a roof top garden. The College shares landscaped garden areas with Basser, Goldstein and the newly established residences; Fig Tree Hall and Colombo House.

Student Life 
The College participates in numerous social and sporting activities throughout the year, including the inter-college The Ruth Wheen Cup and off-campus activities in the local areas of Coogee, Randwick and Sydney CBD. Residents (affectionately termed "ressies") participate in weekly coffee nights in which the House Committee presents new activities, events and news to the wider college.

All student activities are coordinated by the student elected House Committee and overseen by the Dean of College. Recurring activities include harbour cruises on Sydney Harbour, with sister colleges attending; the "Baxter Ball"; "REXTAB" - where ex-residents ("exressies") are invited to attend and "Baxyard Blitz" where an entire floor of the college themes and decorates their living spaces to be judged by the Dean of College. Valedictory dinners are served at the conclusion of each teaching period, often with speeches from notable guest speakers, the dean and House Committee president

Residents at Baxter are also encouraged to produce new traditions and enterprises. A notable example is the "J&D" coffee cart which is run by students and services all of the Kensington Colleges. The profits from the cart are donated to a charitable cause.

The House Committee
The House Committee is annually voted in by the college and is composed of:
Executive
President
Secretary
Treasurer
Portfolio Directors
Two Social Directors
Charities and Communications Director
Cultural Director
One male identifying and one female identifying Sports Director
Operations and Communications Director
Inclusivity and Diversity Director
Inter-Residential Colleges Director

The House Committee is responsible for the organisation, operation and management of particular areas of the college. Each director manages a portfolio that aims to engage residents. The director(s) of each portfolio may appoint officers at their discretion or as mandated by the constitution that then run a particular aspect of the portfolio.

The House Committee is directed by the student-elected executive team, consisting of the president, secretary and treasurer. They work with the dean to ensure the rules of the college and the expectations of the House Committee are upheld and maintained.

References

External links
 Philip Baxter College

Residential colleges of the University of New South Wales
Educational institutions established in 1966
1966 establishments in Australia